The Cotswold Wildlife Park & Gardens exhibits over 260 different species of animals. Around 350,000 people visited the park in 2012.

Animal exhibits 

Walled Garden houses aviaries, including a Humboldt penguin enclosure and a Tropical House with exotic plants and free-roaming sloths, and tropical birds such as great blue turacos, Bali starlings and bleeding heart pigeons. Penguin feeding and talk is held daily at 11 am and 3 pm. Mammals in the Walled Garden include meerkats, yellow mongooses, prairie dogs and a breeding group of Oriental small-clawed otters. There is also a collection of small primates, including squirrel monkeys, pygmy marmosets, red-handed tamarins and emperor tamarins.
Madagascar, opened in 2008, is a walk-through exhibit which draws attention to the plight of endangered lemur species. The mixed exhibit features ring-tailed lemurs, collared lemurs, mongoose lemurs, crowned sifaka, Madagascar teal and radiated tortoise are also on show, and were brought into the collection especially for "Madagascar". The breeding record of the lemur collection is very good with the ring-tailed lemurs giving birth regularly since their introduction in 2009, and the red-bellied lemurs also having bred successfully. Lemur feeding and talk is held daily at noon.
Woodland Walk houses a number of larger animal species from South America including: Brazilian tapir, capybara, Patagonian maras and giant anteaters, as well as Visayan warty pigs. Other enclosures in the walk-through include Canadian timber wolves, white-naped cranes and parma wallabies. The entrance to the woodland walk is via a bridge over the lake, which has a wide variety of ducks and Chilean flamingos.
Large mammals - Large moated paddocks are home to a trio of giraffe, a herd of Chapman's zebra, a group of ostriches and breeding groups of white rhinoceros and Bactrian camels. Nearby are the park's big cat enclosures which house clouded leopards and Asiatic lions.
Reptile House, Bat House and Insect House - The Reptile House is home to species such as black mambas, crocodile monitors, bearded dragons, poison dart frogs, and rhinoceros iguanas. The reticulated pythons, and anacondas are particularly large specimens. The park achieved the first UK breeding for Morelet's crocodiles in 2007, with 12 eggs hatching successfully. The Insect House is home to leaf-cutter ants, scorpions and tarantulas and other species of invertebrates. The Bat House holding Seba's short-tailed bats, Egyptian fruit bats and Turkish spiny mice are in the Reptile Courtyard. and nearby are enclosures for white-handed gibbons and siamangs.
Around the manor house and next to the 600-year-old oak tree outside the orangery, is home to the red pandas. In front of the manor house, next to the rhino paddock, is the Aldabra giant tortoise enclosure. Behind the manor house is the Skymaze adventure playground, picnic area and restaurant.
 Around the railway station includes a variety of owls and birds of prey, such as the great grey owl, snowy owl, and turkey vulture. Nearby is an enclosure for black-and-white colobus. Next to the railway station entrance is the wolverine enclosure. In 2012 the park's wolverines gave birth to the UK's first-ever cubs to be born in captivity. The Park is the only collection in Europe to have successfully bred wolverines. Next to the wolverines are the pheasant aviaries.

History 

In 1804 the estate's owner William Hervey had the current manor house called Bradwell Grove Manor House designed by William Atkinson and built by Richard Pace of Lechlade, in the then-fashionable Georgian Gothic style. This followed the example of Strawberry Hill, Horace Walpole's masterpiece at Twickenham. The house replaced an original 17th-century Jacobean residence, part of which was incorporated into the north service wing. Hervey also planted a great number of trees in the park, many of which can still be seen including a huge wellingtonia tree on the west lawn. This tree is over 40 metres high and can be seen on the skyline from many miles away.

In 1923 the house and estate were purchased by Colonel Heyworth-Savage, and on his death when killed in action in North Africa on 28 December 1941 the estate was passed to his grandson John Heyworth. John Heyworth was born in the manor house on 21 August 1925 and when he left school he served from 1943–1947 in the Royal Dragoons, the regiment which had been commanded by his father. The house was rented out for twenty years to Oxford Regional Hospital Board, until in 1969 John Heyworth decided to open the gardens to the public, and since 1970 the house has been the heart of the Wildlife Park. John Heyworth died on 24 November 2012, and now the managing director is his son Reggie Heyworth.

The Walled Garden was originally a kitchen garden, the area now houses the marmosets and tamarins, contained cold fruit frames full of parma violets and other delicate plants, and on the site of the gardeners' greenhouse stood two structures reputed to be the oldest greenhouses in Oxfordshire. The Tropical House has taken the place of three adjoining greenhouses, the first for carnations, the second for rare hot-house plants and a fig tree, and the third for nectarines and peaches. The water supply for the Walled Garden came from a central well now covered over but still marked. There was a cricket pitch on what is now the grass car park, and two grass tennis courts outside the drawing room and brass-rubbing room. Many years ago, there was even a private nine-hole golf course covering what is now the ostrich enclosure and surrounding area.

The manor house now has various roles, with its many rooms being used as visitor areas. The old dining room – still with its original curtains, panelling and fireplace – has become the brass-rubbing centre; the drawing room is used for meetings, exhibitions and conferences; the library is now a bar area; the original kitchen has been turned into a storeroom and a self-contained flat; and other rooms are used as administration and maintenance offices, storerooms and staff accommodation. Even the maze of cellars is used for hibernating certain species from the reptile collection. The old stables and other out-buildings now the reptile and bat houses, classrooms, offices and the quarantine area. The billiard room is now the restaurant kitchen, and its billiard table was turned into the lower tier of the waterfall in the penguin enclosure.

Other exhibits

Train 

The  narrow gauge railway runs in a circuit (just under a mile long) around the park. The station is located on the edge of the woods between the owl aviaries and the Walled Garden.

The railway was first installed in 1974, in a horseshoe-shaped circuit from the current station round to the giant tortoises in front of the manor house. The circuit was completed and the station rebuilt in 2007, when it was officially opened by the local M.P., the Rt. Hon. David Cameron.

The train is called Bella in memory of one of the original white rhinos at the park.

Park and gardens 

The park is well known for its exotic planting, particularly in the favourable micro-climate of the Walled Garden, where bananas and cannas are a speciality. There is a huge pair of Californian redwood trees, imposing tree ferns and giant rhubarb with unusual foliage.

The exotic birds and animals are complemented by flamboyant planting schemes. The South Terrace has been given a period feel, although in fact the terrace, balustrade and pond were constructed in 1989, thanks to a generous legacy from a regular visitor to the park, Miss Daisy Louise Eley. By contrast, the planting around the West Terrace, in front of and around the restaurant is more contemporary. In May the front of the restaurant is draped in wisteria flowers. The 'Winter Garden', between the owls and the siamang gibbons is planted with a wide range of perennials, bulbs and woody plants with an emphasis on providing interest in winter.

Bamboo is a particular favourite at the park, with over fifty varieties planted. They are cut regularly for browse for the animals. The bamboo grows well here because of regular mulching of rhino manure. There is prairie-style planting around the rhino paddock to echo the African plains. The remains of a huge cedar of Lebanon in the Adventure Playground now supports the children's tree house and slide.

Conservation 
As of October 2006, the Cotswold Wildlife Park holds 40 species, which are part of either an ESB (European Studbook) or EEP (European Endangered Species Programme). It is the studbook holder for the red-crested turaco and Mount Omei babbler. In addition, both the crested pigeon and blue-winged kookaburra are monitored species. In August 2015, the park announced that a second white rhinoceros had been born at the park.

Gallery 
All photographs were taken in the park.

References

External links 

 

Zoos in England
West Oxfordshire District
Tourist attractions in Oxfordshire
Buildings and structures in Oxfordshire
Gardens in Oxfordshire
Cotswolds
Zoos established in 1970